William Henry Landes (December 13, 1858 – December 30, 1931) was an American lawyer and politician who served ten years as mayor of Staunton, Virginia and briefly as a member of the Virginia Senate. A Democrat, he won a January 1915 special election to succeed Edward Echols in the Senate but lost reelection later that year to Independent Cornelius T. Jordan.

References

External links

1858 births
1931 deaths
Democratic Party Virginia state senators
19th-century American politicians
19th-century American lawyers
20th-century American politicians
20th-century American lawyers
Virginia lawyers